Jean-Pierre Kohut-Svelko (born in 1946) is a French production designer and art director. He is a César Award winner and 6 times nominee.

He worked several times with legend of the French cinema François Truffaut, Yves Robert, André Téchiné and Claude Miller.

Filmography

References

External links

1946 births
French production designers
French art directors
Film people from Paris
Living people